Life Behind Machines is the fifth full-length studio album from Allister, a pop punk band from Chicago, Illinois, released in the U.S. on November 6, 2012.

This is the band's second album with Universal Japan and their first full-length since 2010's Countdown to Nowhere. It continues on with Allister's old pop punk sound but adds a few out-of-genre anomalies throughout the album. The band then released a music video for the single "5 Years" on October 3, 2012.

Track listing

References

Allister albums
2012 albums